Hypersonic Broadcasting Center is a Philippine radio network. Its corporate office is located at HBC Bldg., Penaranda St., Brgy. Iraya, Legazpi, Albay.

HBC Stations

AM Stations

FM Stations

Former Stations

References

Philippine radio networks